Peter Howson OBE (born 27 March 1958) is a Scottish painter. He was a British official war artist in 1993 during the Bosnian War.

Early life
Peter Howson was born in London of Scottish parents and moved with his family to Prestwick, Ayrshire, when he was four. He was raised in a religious family and the first ever painting he did was a Crucifixion, when he was 6 years old.

Career
His work has encompassed a number of themes. His early works are typified by very masculine working class men, most famously in The Heroic Dosser (1987). Later, in 1993, he was commissioned by the Imperial War Museum of London, to be the official war artist for the Bosnian War. Here he produced some of his most shocking and controversial work detailing the atrocities which were taking place at the time, like Plum Grove (1994). One painting in particular, Croatian and Muslim, detailing a rape created controversy partly because of its explicit subject matter but also because Howson had painted it from the victims' accounts. He was the official war painter at the Kosovo War for the London Times.

In more recent years his work has exhibited strong religious themes which some say is linked to the treatment of his alcoholism and drug addiction at the Castle Craig Hospital in Peebles in 2000, after which he converted to Christianity. An example of this is  Judas (2002) which 

His work has appeared in other media, with his widest exposure arguably for a British postage stamp he did in 1999 to celebrate engineering achievements for the millennium. In addition his work has been used on album covers by Live (Throwing Copper), The Beautiful South (Quench) and Jackie Leven (Fairytales for Hardmen). His work features in major collections including Ben Uri Gallery and Museum, Edinburgh City Art Centre, Glasgow Museums Resource Centre, Ferens Art Gallery, Guildhall Art Gallery, Harris Museum and Art Gallery, Herbert Art Gallery and Museum, High Life Highland Exhibitions Unit, Huntarian Art Gallery, Jerwood Collection, Middlesbrough Institute of Modern Art, National Galleries of Scotland, Nottingham City Museums and Galleries, Rozelle House Galleries, The Dick Institute, Fitzwilliam Museum, The Fleming Collection, Ingram Collection of Modern British Art and The Wilson.

Howson was appointed Officer of the Order of the British Empire (OBE) in the 2009 Birthday Honours. In November 2010, BBC Scotland aired a documentary named "The Madness of Peter Howson" which followed the final stages of the completion of a grand commission for show in the renovated St Andrew's Cathedral and also dealt with Howson's struggle with mental illness and Asperger's syndrome.

In September 2014, Howson suggested he would hand back his OBE, predominantly because of his dislike of British foreign policy but it is not clear if he ever did so.

The film Prophecy, directed by Charlie Paul and produced by Lucy Paul, is an intimate exploration of a single oil painting and the first major film to reveal the motive and techniques behind each stroke of paint Peter Howson creates. With a remarkably acute focus, the film follows the creation of Howson's painting Prophecy, its exhibition and sale, as it travels from the artist’s studio in Glasgow to New York, before returning to London to enter the collection of a private buyer.

Bibliography
Monographs
 Berkoff, Stephen, Peter Howson, Flowers (2005)
 Heller, Robert, Peter Howson, Momentum (2003)
 Jackson, Allan, A Different Man, Mainstream Publishing (1997)
 Heller, Robert, Peter Howson, Mainstream Publishing (1993)

Exhibition Catalogues
 Harrowing of Hell, 24 October - 22 November 2008, Flowers East
 Christos Aneste, 18 March - 7 May 2005, Flowers East
 Inspired by the Bible, 6–20 August 2004, New College, Edinburgh
 The Stations of the Cross, 11 April - 18 May 2003, Flowers East
 The Third Step, 13 April - 4 June 2002, Flowers East
 The Rake’s Progress, 12 January - 11 February 1996, Flowers East
 Blind Leading the Blind, 9 November- 8 December 1991, Flowers East

References

External links 
 Peter Howson profile, FlowersGallery.com 
 Peter Howson.net
 Peter Howson website
 Glasgow Print Studio (view Howson works on-line)
 Peter Howson profile,  Asperger-Syndrome.me.uk
 Donald Kuspit, Bipolar Paintings: PETER HOWSON, THE SCOTTISH BOSCH, artnet.com

 Peter Howson at National Portrait Gallery, London (npg.org.uk)
 

1958 births
Scottish people of Irish descent
20th-century Scottish painters
Scottish male painters
21st-century Scottish painters
21st-century Scottish male artists
Alumni of the Glasgow School of Art
Artists commissioned by the Imperial War Museum
British war artists
Living people
Officers of the Order of the British Empire
Painters from London
People educated at Prestwick Academy
People from South Ayrshire
People with Asperger syndrome
Royal Highland Fusiliers soldiers
Scottish contemporary artists
Converts to Christianity
Scottish Christians
20th-century Scottish male artists
Neo-expressionist artists